Eddie Dibbs (born February 23, 1951) is a retired American tennis player also nicknamed "Fast Eddie". He attained a career-high singles ranking of world No. 5 in July 1978, winning 22 titles and being a runner-up another 20 times.

Dibbs holds the record number of ATP Tour career match wins for a player who never reached a Grand Slam final. He did reach two semifinals, both at Roland Garros, losing to Guillermo Vilas in 1975 and to Adriano Panatta in 1976. His most significant victory was defeating Jimmy Connors, 1–6, 6–1, 7–5 in London on carpet.

In 1976, only one other American player, Connors, had a better record than Dibbs. In 1977, Dibbs was the 2nd highest ranked American in the tour. In the 1978 season, he ended the year as the leading money winner on the professional tennis tour. 

Dibbs was consistently ranked in the top 10 tour rankings for five years from 1975 to 1979. He is also the American tennis player with most singles victories in clay ever in the Open Era and ranks 7th all-time in overall singles victories on clay.

Dibbs is credited with coining the tennis term "bagel" to describe a 6–0 set. Dibbs played doubles with Harold Solomon. They were nicknamed "The Bagel Twins" by Bud Collins. In 1976, they were ranked No. 4 worldwide, and they were among the top ten also in 1974, 1975 and 1976.

A 2011 ranking system created at Northwestern University based on quality of performances and number of victories ranked Dibbs in the top 20 greatest players of all time.

Biography 
Dibbs was born in Brooklyn, New York to Lebanese parents. His family moved to Miami when he was a youngster where he started playing at a young age. He was a two-time state singles champion for Miami Beach High School and attended the University of Miami for three years before turning professional. At the University of Miami he compiled a 93% winning record and was an NCAA All-American twice. He was inducted in the University of Miami Sports Hall of Fame in 1987.

Career finals

Singles: 42 (22 wins, 20 losses)

Grand Slam singles performance timeline

References

External links

 
 

American male tennis players
Sportspeople from Brooklyn
Tennis people from New York (state)
1951 births
American people of Lebanese descent
Living people
People from North Miami Beach, Florida
Sportspeople of Lebanese descent
Miami Hurricanes men's tennis players